Owen Robert Miller (born November 15, 1996) is an American professional baseball infielder for the Milwaukee Brewers of Major League Baseball (MLB). He has previously played in MLB for the Cleveland Indians / Guardians. He made his MLB debut in 2021 with the Indians.

Amateur career
Miller attended Ozaukee High School in Fredonia, Wisconsin. He played football and basketball for Ozaukee all four years. He did not play high school baseball after his freshman year, focusing strictly on travel baseball. He went undrafted in the 2015 MLB draft, and enrolled at Illinois State University where he played college baseball for the Redbirds.

In 2016, Miller's freshman season, he started all 54 of ISU's games, hitting .328 with five home runs and 44 RBIs. As a sophomore in 2017, he slashed .325/.351/.498 with six home runs and 48 RBIs in 56 games, earning a spot on the All-Missouri Valley Conference Second-Team. After the season, he played collegiate summer baseball with the Harwich Mariners of the Cape Cod Baseball League, and also played in the Northwoods League. In 2018, as a junior, he batted .384 with six home runs and 35 RBIs in 52 games and earned All-MVC First-Team honors.

Professional career

San Diego Padres
Miller was selected by the San Diego Padres in the third round of the 2018 MLB draft. He signed with the Padres for $500,000, and made his professional debut with the Tri-City Dust Devils of the Class A Short Season Northwest League, where he was named an  All-Star. He was promoted to the Fort Wayne TinCaps of the Class A Midwest League in August. In 75 games between the two clubs, he slashed .336/.386/.460 with four home runs and 33 RBIs. He spent the 2019 season with the Amarillo Sod Poodles of the Class AA Texas League and was named an All-Star. Over 130 games, Miller slashed .290/.355/.430 with 13 home runs and 68 RBIs. Following the 2019 season, Miller played for the Peoria Javelinas of the Arizona Fall League.

Cleveland Indians / Guardians
On August 31, 2020, Miller, along with Austin Hedges, Cal Quantrill, Josh Naylor, Gabriel Arias, and Joey Cantillo was traded to the Cleveland Indians in exchange for Mike Clevinger, Greg Allen, and Matt Waldron. He did not play a minor league game in 2020 due to the cancellation of the minor league season caused by the COVID-19 pandemic. To begin the 2021 season, he was assigned to the Columbus Clippers of the Triple-A East.

On May 23, 2021, Miller was selected to the Indians' 40-man roster and promoted to the major leagues for the first time. At the time of his promotion, he was batting .406 with two home runs and nine runs batted in over 16 games with Columbus. He made his major league debut the same day as the designated hitter against the Minnesota Twins, going hitless in five at-bats with three strikeouts. He recorded his first major league hit, an infield single, on May 24 versus Spencer Turnbull of the Detroit Tigers. On July 31, Miller hit his first career home run off of Dallas Keuchel of the Chicago White Sox. For the 2021 season, Miller appeared in sixty games for the Indians, batting .204 with four home runs and 18 RBIs.

In 2022 he batted .243/.301/.351, and had the fastest sprint speed of all major league first basemen, at 29.0 feet per second.

Milwaukee Brewers
On December 14, 2022, Miller was traded to the Milwaukee Brewers for a player to be named later and an unspecified amount of cash.

Personal life
Miller's younger brother, Noah, was selected by the Minnesota Twins with the 36th overall selection in the 2021 MLB draft.

References

External links

1996 births
Living people
Amarillo Sod Poodles players
Baseball players from Wisconsin
Cleveland Guardians players
Cleveland Indians players
Columbus Clippers players
Fort Wayne TinCaps players
Harwich Mariners players
Illinois State Redbirds baseball players
Major League Baseball shortstops
People from Mequon, Wisconsin
Peoria Javelinas players
Tri-City Dust Devils players
Lakeshore Chinooks players